E28 may refer to: 
 BMW 5 Series (E28)
 European route E28
 Sultan Abdul Halim Muadzam Shah Bridge, Malaysian expressway Route E28
 Kobe-Awaji-Naruto Expressway, route E28 in Japan
 Tochomae Station on the Toei Oedo line in Tokyo